Sakka Podu Podu Raja may refer to:
 Sakka Podu Podu Raja (1978 film), an Indian Tamil-language film
 Sakka Podu Podu Raja (2017 film), an Indian Tamil-language action comedy film